Świetliki (The Fireflies) are a Polish band formed in Kraków in October 1992. They perform music described as a mix of alternative rock and sung poetry.

Marcin Świetlicki is a lead vocalist and author of lyrics in most songs. Grzegorz Dyduch plays bass guitar. Since 2005, the group has often invited actor Bogusław Linda to participate in recordings and concerts as a guest vocalist.

Until 2020, the group released six studio albums and performed 191 concerts.

Band members
Current members
 Marcin Świetlicki – vocals (1992–present)
 Grzegorz Dyduch – bass guitar, double bass, baritone guitar (1992–present)
 Marek Piotrowicz – drums (1992–present)
 Tomasz Radziszewski – electric guitar (1992–present)
 Zuzanna Iwańska – viola (2011–present)
 Michał Wandzilak – keyboards  (2012–present)

Discography

Studio albums

References

Polish alternative rock groups
Sung poetry of Poland
Musical groups established in 1992